U.S. Route 730 (US 730) is an east–west United States Highway, of which all but 6.08 miles of its 41.78 miles (9.78 of 67.24 km) are within the state of Oregon. The highway starts in rural Morrow County in Eastern Oregon at an interchange with Interstate 84 (I-84) and US 30, located east of the city of Boardman. US 730 travels east along the Columbia River as a continuation of Columbia River Highway No. 2 into Umatilla County, intersecting I-82 and US 395 in the city of Umatilla. US 730 and US 395 form a short concurrency within the city before the highways part, with US 730 continuing northeast into Washington. The highway travels through rural Walla Walla County and ends at an intersection with US 12 south of Wallula.

US 730 was created with the original United States Highways on November 11, 1926, traveling on the existing Columbia River Highway, established in 1917, from US 30 in Umatilla to US 410 south of Wallula. The Washington section of US 730 was added to the state highway system in 1923 as a branch of State Road 3, later becoming a branch of Primary State Highway 3 (PSH 3) in 1937. The highway was concurrent with US 395 from 1937 until 1985, traveling from Cold Springs Junction to US 410. US 30 was moved to a new route bypassing Umatilla and Irrigon in 1946, allowing for US 730 to be extended southwest to Boardman, later to an interchange with I-84.

Route description

US 730 runs  in Oregon and Washington and is listed as part of the National Highway System, a system of roads crucial to the nation's economy, defense and mobility, from its western terminus at I-84 east of Boardman to the end of its concurrency with US 395 in Umatilla. As a state highway in both states, the roadway is maintained by the Oregon Department of Transportation (ODOT) and Washington State Department of Transportation (WSDOT). US 730 has the highest designation of any United States Numbered Highway, or U.S. route, and is the shortest existing highway in the system. The highway is defined by the Washington State Legislature as SR 730, part of the Revised Code of Washington as §47.17.821.

Oregon

US 730 begins at a partial cloverleaf interchange with I-84 and US 30 at Boardman Junction, located east of the city of Boardman in Morrow County. The highway, a continuation of Columbia River Highway No. 2, travels northeast across a Union Pacific rail line and passes the Umatilla National Wildlife Refuge on the Columbia River before reaching the city of Irrigon. From Irrigon, US 730 continues northeast along the Columbia River into Umatilla County and becomes 6th Street in the city of Umatilla. The highway intersects I-82 and US 395 in a diamond interchange and forms a short concurrency with US 395. US 730 continues east through the unincorporated community of McNary and the northern terminus of Oregon Route 207 (OR 207) in rural Umatilla County. The highway turns northeastward along Lake Wallula and intersects OR 37 at Cold Springs Junction, providing connections north to the Warehouse Beach Recreation Area and Hat Rock State Park on the Columbia River and south to the city of Pendleton. US 730 heads into Washington, traveling between a Union Pacific rail line and the canyon walls of the Columbia River Gorge. An ODOT survey measuring traffic volume for any average day of the year, expressed in terms of annual average daily traffic (AADT), was conducted in 2011 on US 730 and calculated that the busiest section of the highway in Oregon was at its interchange with I-82, serving 11,800 vehicles, while the least busy section of the highway was at the Washington state line, serving 2,500 vehicles.

Washington

US 730 continues north from Oregon along Lake Wallula and around Clover Hill, reaching Wallula Junction in Walla Walla County. The highway intersects its spur route and turns east towards its eastern terminus at US 12 south of the community of Wallula. Every year, WSDOT conducts a series of surveys on its highways in the state to measure traffic volume, expressed in terms of AADT. In 2012, WSDOT calculated that the Washington section of US 730 served between 1,500 and 2,400 vehicles per day.

History

The highway that became US 730 within Oregon has been designated by the Oregon State Highway Commission as the easternmost segment of Columbia River Highway No. 2 since November 27, 1917, created as part of the initial named state highway system. The segment of US 730 within Washington was added to the state highway system in 1923 as a branch of State Road 3 and kept its designation as a branch of PSH 3 during the creation of the primary and secondary highway system in 1937. The United States Highway System was adopted on November 11, 1926, by the American Association of State Highway Officials (AASHO) and included US 730, traveling northeast along the Columbia River from US 30 in Umatilla to US 410 south of Wallula. The highway was originally planned to be numbered as US 420, but was changed after US 30 was substituted in place of US 20 along the Columbia River. US 395 was extended south from Spokane, Washington, to San Diego, California, in 1937, becoming concurrent with US 730 between Cold Springs Junction and its eastern terminus at US 410 south of Wallula.

US 30 was moved to a new section of the Old Oregon Trail Highway No. 6, bypassing the cities of Irrigon and Umatilla, on November 25, 1946. US 730 was subsequently extended west to a new junction with US 30 and later relocated uphill due to the construction of the John Day Dam. The highway's western terminus was moved further south to an interchange with I-80N in 1967. During the westward extension of US 12 from Idaho into Washington, the Oregon state government suggested to the AASHO a route that included the entirety of US 730 in 1962, while Washington state suggested routing US 12 over US 410 and Washington State Route 12 (SR 12) to Vancouver, Washington. The AASHO approved the extension of US 12 into Washington on June 20, 1967, routing it along US 410 and SR 14 to its present terminus in Aberdeen. US 395 was re-aligned to a concurrency with I-82 in 1985, crossing the Columbia River on the Umatilla Bridge and having a shorter concurrency with US 730. The old route of US 395 from Cold Springs Junction to Pendleton, part of Pendleton-Cold Springs Highway No. 36, became Oregon Route 37.

The highway's eastern terminus in Wallula is planned to be moved further north to a new interchange with US 12 after the completion of the Burbank–Walla Walla divided highway in the 2020s.

Spur route

US 730 has a  spur route in rural Walla Walla County that connects it to US 12 westbound towards Wallula, while US 730 is directed towards eastbound US 12 towards the city of Walla Walla. WSDOT included the road in its annual AADT survey in 2012 and calculated that 1,300 vehicles used the spur route.

Major intersections

See also
 
 
 
 List of United States Numbered Highways

Notes

References

External links

 
 US 730 at US Highway Ends
 US 730 at ORoads
 US 730 at Highways of Washington State

30-7
7
30-7
30-7
Transportation in Morrow County, Oregon
Transportation in Umatilla County, Oregon
Transportation in Walla Walla County, Washington